Land mine contamination in Bosnia and Herzegovina is a serious aftereffect of the Bosnian War, which took place from 1992 until 1995. During this time period, all 3 conflicting factions (ARBiH, HVO, and VRS) planted land mines near the current-day political entity borders. As a result, the country has had the most severe land mine problems in the world.

Land mine situation

Bosnia and Herzegovina's land mine contamination stems exclusively from the 1992–95 war in the country. By 1996, some two million land mines and unexploded munitions littered Bosnia. By September 2013, land mines and unexploded munitions remained scattered in 28,699 locations. A total of 1,230.70 km2 (2.4% of the country's territory) was mined. In May 2014, extensive landslides and the worst flooding since the 19th century unearthed landmines, prompting authorities to send in de-mining workers to locate and deactivate mines that were threatening residential areas.

Land mine clearing is done by various government agencies and NGOs as well as some NATO military units. Between 1996 and 2017, more than 3,000 square kilometres have been cleared of mines. Bosnia and Herzegovina's strategic vision in 2008 was to clear all land mines by the year 2019. In April 2017, experts thought it would take at least five years longer, citing a lack of funds as the primary hurdle. 80,000 mines were estimated to be yet uncleared, located across 2.2% (1,125 km2) of the Bosnian territory.

On 4 April, International Mine Awareness Day, the government, the UN and a number of other international and local NGOs inform citizens about the dangers of land mines and the efforts to clear them.

Land mine casualties
From 1992 through 2008, 5,005 people were killed or injured by land mines or unexploded munitions. Wartime casualties stood at 3,339 killed and injured. Peacetime casualties, from 1996 through 2008 number 1,666 of which 486 persons were fatalities. From 1996 to 2017, more than 1,750 people were injured, at least 612 of them fatalities.

References

External links

Bosnia and Herzegovina Mine Action Centre

Bosnia
Bosnian War